The Fourth Ward Historic District is a historic district in Albuquerque, New Mexico which encompasses an area between Downtown and Old Town which is roughly bounded by Central Avenue, 8th Street and Keleher Avenue, Lomas Boulevard, and 15th Street. It is named for its location in the city's former fourth political ward. The district is almost entirely residential and developed at a "leisurely pace" between the 1880s and 1930s. As a result, it includes houses in a wide variety of sizes and styles including Queen Anne, Italianate, Tudor, Dutch Colonial, Prairie School, Mediterranean, Pueblo, Territorial, Mission, and Bungalow. The district was added to the New Mexico State Register of Cultural Properties in 1979 and the National Register of Historic Places in 1980.

The district includes two properties which are also individually listed on the National Register, the J. H. O'Rielly House and Berthold Spitz House.

References

Historic districts in New Mexico
New Mexico State Register of Cultural Properties
National Register of Historic Places in Albuquerque, New Mexico